Les Touches is a commune in the Loire-Atlantique department in western France.

See also
Communes of the Loire-Atlantique department

References

Touches, Les